Kolar Assembly seat is one of the seats in Karnataka Legislative Assembly in India. It is a segment of Kolar Lok Sabha constituency.

Members of Assembly 
 1957 : D.Abdul Rasheed   (INC)
 1962 : P.Venkatagiriyappa (IND)
 1967 : P.Venkatagiriyappa (IND)
 1972 : D.Venkataramiah   (INC)
 1978 : M.Abdul latheef   (INC)
 1983 : K.R.Srinivasaiah  (IND)
 1985 : K.R.Srinivasaiah  (IND)
 1989 : K.A.Nisar Ahmed   (INC)
 1994 : K.Srinivasa Gowda (IND)
 1999 : K.Srinivasa Gowda (JDU)
 2004 : K.Srinivasa Gowda (INC)
 2008 : R.Varthur Prakash (IND)
 2013 : R.Varthur Prakash (IND)
 2018 : K.Srinivasa Gowda (JDS)

Election results

2018

1967 Assembly Election
 P. Venkatagiriyappa (IND) : 13,216 votes    
 D. A. Rashid (INC) : 	9042 votes

1972 Assembly Election
 D. Venkatramiah (IND) : 14,639 votes    
 P. Venkatagiriyappa (IND) : 13,147 votes

2013 Assembly Election
 R Vathur Prakash (IND) : 62,957 votes  
 K. Srinivasa Gowda (JD-S) : 50,366 votes
 Naseer Ahmed (Congress) : 41,510 votes 
 M S Anand (BJP) : 1,617

See also 
 Kolar District
 List of constituencies of Karnataka Legislative Assembly

References 

Assembly constituencies of Karnataka